Dark Life is the first book in a futuristic adventure fiction and science fiction  series of the same name by Kat Falls. The novel was published May 1, 2010 by Scholastic. Falls has written a sequel: Rip Tide.  Scholastic has published a study guide for the books.

Publishing rights outside the USA were sold in six languages.

Plot summary
The world has been plunged underwater leaving very little land left above water. A teenage boy, Ty, has spent his entire life underwater helping his family farm their sea homestead. Ty meets a teenage girl, Gemma, from the land, who is looking for her brother. A group of sea bandits known as the "Seablite Gang" attacks Ty's homestead and he and Gemma try to capture the bandits. However, a member of the gang, Shade, turns out to be Gemma's brother. It also turns out that Shade, like Ty, has a "dark gift" that allows him to change his appearance, however Ty's dark gift is that he is able to use echo-location similar to a bat.

Awards
Dark Life was nominated for the following awards.

Sunshine State Young Reader Award (2011)
Children's Book Award (2011)
Rebecca Caudill Young Reader's Book Award (2011)
Maud Hart Lovelace Award (2011)
Truman Reader's Award (2011)
Golden Sower Award (2011)
Buckeye Children's Book Award (2011)
Junior Book Award (2011)
Beehive Book Award (2011)
Dorothy Canfield Fisher Children's Book Award (2011)

Film adaptation
On April 5, 2010, Robert Zemeckis was set to direct the film adaptation for Disney and will co-produce with Gotham Group through ImageMovers.

References

External links

2010 children's books
2010 American novels
2010 science fiction novels
Children's science fiction novels
American children's novels
American science fiction novels
Novels set in the future
Scholastic Corporation books